Gruimorphae is a clade of birds that contains the orders Charadriiformes (plovers, gulls, and allies) and Gruiformes (cranes and rails) identified by molecular analysis. This grouping has had historical support, as various charadriiform families such as the families Pedionomidae and Turnicidae were classified as gruiforms. It may also have support from the fossil record since the discovery of Nahmavis from the Early Eocene of North America.

The relationship between these birds is due to similar anatomical and behavioral characteristics. A morphological study went further to suggest that the gruiforms might be paraphyletic in respect to the shorebirds, with the rails being closely related to the buttonquails.

References

Neognathae
Extant Campanian first appearances